Koson is a Hasidic dynasty originating in the village of Koson (also Kossyny or Kaszony) in Ukraine. The dynasty was founded by Rabbi Yehosef Rottenberg in 1897.

History

Bnei Shileishim 

Rabbi Yehosef Rottenberg was born in Halych in 1853 to Rabbi Tzvi Hirsh and Chaya Dreizya Rottenberg. He studied under Rabbi Chaim Halberstam of Sanz and Rabbi Yekusiel Yehuda Teitelbaum of Siget. Rabbi Yehosef married Rebbetzin Sara Yittel, the daughter of Rabbi Meshulim Feish Segal-Lowy I of Tosh and authored the sefer Bnei Shileishem (and is therefore sometimes referred to by its name). He settled in Koson in 1897 where he served as rebbe. After his death in 1911, he was succeeded as rebbe in Koson by his son, Rabbi Chaim Shlomo Rottenberg.

Shmuah Tovah 

Rabbi Chaim Shlomo Rottenberg married Raitze, daughter of Rabbi Asher Yashaya Rubin  of Kolbuszowa, Poland, and authored the sefer Shmuah Tovah. In 1920 however, nine years after assuming the position of rebbe, Rabbi Chaim Shlomo died, and was succeeded by his younger brother (and son-in-law), Rabbi Yisrael Tzvi Rottenberg, known by the name of his sefer, Ohr Moleh.

Ohr Moleh 

As Rebbe, the Ohr Moleh established a hasidic yeshiva, Yeshiva Ateres Tzvi, in Koson that attracted over a hundred students from throughout the region who came to study Torah for a year or more. For the Yamim Tovim, many more chassidim would come to Koson to be with the rebbe. During World War II in 1944, the entire Jewish community of Koson was taken to the Beregszasz brick factory in nearby Berehove, and soon after, they were deported to Auschwitz. The Ohr Moleh and all his children, save for one son-in-law, perished there.

Post World War II 

A third son of the Bnei Shileishim (and a brother of the Shmuah Tovah and the Ohr Moleh), Rabbi Moshe Shmuel Rottenberg served as a rabbi in Kleinvardein before emigrating to Los Angeles, and was recognized as the Kosoner Rebbe. His son, Rabbi Pinchas Shalom Rottenberg, served as Kosoner Rebbe in New York, as did his son after him, Rabbi Menachem Yisrael Rottenberg. He was succeeded by five sons: Rabbi Meir Yehosef in Borough Park, Brooklyn and, later, in Linden, New Jersey; Rabbi Moshe Shmuel in London, England; Rabbi Naftali Tzvi in Flatbush, Brooklyn and, later, in Hillcrest, New York; Rabbi Avraham Baruch in Lakewood Township, New Jersey; and Rabbi Chaim Yehuda Leib (Chaim Leibish) in Monsey, New York.

Chanukah attack 

The Koson community came under the spotlight when an anti-Semitic machete attack occurred on Hanukkah, December 28, 2019, in the home of Rabbi Chaim Leibish Rottenberg, the Kossoner Rebbe of Monsey, New York. After the attack, Then-New York Governor Andrew Cuomo said, standing outside Rabbi Rottenberg's home, "This is an intolerant time in our country. We see anger. We see hatred exploding. It is an American cancer on the body politic." Then-President Donald Trump called the attack "horrific" and said that "we must all come together to fight, confront, and eradicate the evil scourge of anti-Semitism."

Linden, New Jersey 

Rabbi Meir Yehosef Rottenberg, a son of Rabbi Menachem Yisrael Rottenberg, served as Kossoner Rebbe in Borough Park, Brooklyn before relocating his congregation to Linden, New Jersey. Although the community had started out very small, it grew quickly and currently includes families living in nearby Roselle, Cranford, Clark, and Rahway. After the opening of the Kosonner congregation, other Hasidic communities sprouted in Linden as well, including Bobov, Rachmastrivka, Pupa, and Satmar communities.

Israel 

The son of the Shmuah Tovah, Rabbi Moshe Shmuel Rottenberg (also the first cousin of Rabbi Pinchas Shalom Rottenberg, Kosoner Rebbe of New York), served as a rabbi in Debrecen. He later emigrated to New York, where he became recognized as the Kozova Rebbe and in 1961, to Bnei Brak, Israel. His son, Rabbi Asher Rottenberg, continued the Kosoner dynasty in Bnei Brak  (two of his other sons, Rabbis Yechiel Mechel and Chaim Shlomo Rottenberg, succeeded him as Kozova Rebbe).

Lineage of the Kosonner dynasty 

Included in the dynasty of the Kosoner Rebbes are the Kozova Rebbes, who descend from Rabbi Yehosef Rottenberg as well.
 Rabbi Yehosef Rottenberg of Koson (1853-1911), Bnei Shileishim, Kosoner Rebbe
 Rabbi Chaim Shlomo Rottenberg of Koson (1870-1920), Shmuah Tovah, Kosoner Rebbe
 Rabbi Moshe Shmuel Rottenberg II of Debrecen, New York, and Bnei Brak (c. 1895-1975), Kozova Rebbe
 Rabbi Asher Yeshayahu Rottenberg of Bnei Brak, Kosoner Rebbe
 Rabbi Eliezer Shlomo Schick of Yavne'el and New York (1940-2015), son-in-law of Rabbi Asher Rottenberg, Breslover rabbi
 Rabbi Yechiel Mechel Rottenberg of Crown Heights (d. 2008), New York, Kozova Rebbe
 Rabbi Chaim Shlomo Rottenberg of Flatbush, New York (d. 1990), Kozova Rebbe
 Rabbi Tuvia Rottenberg of Flatbush, New York, Kozova Rebbe
 Rabbi Yisrael Tzvi Rottenberg of Koson (1889-1944), Ohr Moleh, Kosoner Rebbe
 Rabbi Chananya Yom Tov Lipa Teitelbaum (1911-1983), son-in-law of the Ohr Moleh, Nirbater Rav
 Rabbi Moshe Shmuel Rottenberg I of Kleinvardein and Los Angeles (1874-1946), Kosoner Rebbe
 Rabbi Pinchas Shalom Rottenberg of New York (1892-1966), Kosoner Rebbe
 Rabbi Meshulam Feish Rottenberg of New York (1931-2014), Kosoner Rebbe
 Rabbi Menachem Yisrael Rottenberg of New York (1928-?), Kosoner Rebbe
 Rabbi Meir Yehosef Rottenberg of Linden, Kosoner Rebbe
 Rabbi Chaim Yehudah Leibish Rottenberg of Monsey, New York (b. 1958), Koson-Forshay Rebbe
 Rabbi Avraham Baruch Rottenberg of Lakewood, Kosoner Rebbe
 Rabbi Moshe Shmuel Rottenberg of London, Kosoner Rebbe
 Rabbi Naftali Tzvi Rottenberg of Hillcreast, Kosoner Rebbe 
Rabbi Yeshaya Meshilem feish of Rozla ( Eretz Yisrael)

References 

Hasidic dynasties
Culture in Zakarpattia Oblast
Linden, New Jersey
Hasidic Judaism in Ukraine
People from Zakarpattia Oblast